James Addison Jones, (20 August 1869 - 25 May 1950) was the founder of J.A. Jones Construction, as well as being a known philanthropist for many organizations such as the Methodist Church, the city of Charlotte, North Carolina and surrounding areas, regional hospitals and several other companies. He was the benefactor and namesake for the James Addison Jones Library at Greensboro College and the J.A. Jones Library at Brevard College.  His company was also responsible for assisting in the building of the Liberty fleet during World War II. Jones was married four times in his lifetime and had fifteen children.

Early life

Birth and parentage 

James Addison Jones was born in Farmer, North Carolina, on August 20, 1869, to Robert B. Jones and Elizabeth Horney Jones (21 August 1839 – 15 June 1872).  Jones had multiple siblings in descending order: John, William, Sherman and Emma.

Childhood 

Jones was only able to attend school a few months out of the year at a local one-room country school as his duties were on the family farm. It is reported that he did not receive any formal education past the fourth grade. He left home when he was eighteen years old with no money and no formal skills to rely on.

In Lexington, North Carolina, Jones got his first job from Mr. Cecil, a contractor building the first cotton mill in Charlotte, North Carolina, who hired him to drive a wagon, transporting the machine to make bricks   Jim was paid twenty-five cents a day with room and board in the construction camp to make bricks.  He eventually became the mason’s tender and then promoted to apprentice mason.

Personal history

Marriages 

Jones was married four times, losing his first three wives to illness and survived by his final wife.  He had fifteen children born to him between three of his wives.  Five of his children died before Jones.  Twice, he was left alone with infant children, having to hire the assistance of either a nurse or a live in housekeeper.  
 Mary Jane Hooper "Minnie" Jones met Mary Jane Hooper, known as "Minnie," through church. They had twelve children as follows: Edwin Lee, born 1891, Bobbie who died as an infant, Raymond Allen born 1894, Hannibal Berryman born 1897, Frances Elizabeth born 1900, James Addison Jr. born 1902, Johnie Hooper born 1904, Minnie Beatrice born 1906, William Franklin born 1908, Dorothy May born 1910, Paul Stewart born 1912, and Helen Estelle born 1914.
 Emma Lockhart Renn  Jones married again in September 1915 to Emma Lockhart Renn, a teacher, and they had two children together, Emma Renn in 1916 and Robert Joseph in 1918. The Jones family reached state and national recognition when they bought $15,000 for the War Savings Club in support of the First World War. It was the single highest donation in the nation.  
 Maude Boren  Jones married Maude Boren in September 1920 and they had one child together, Charles Boren Jones on 12 June 1921. 
 Rose Walsh   At age 72, Jones married Rose Walse on 16 January 1942. They did not have any children. Rose would survive Jones in 1950.

Children 
 Education: Five of his children (Edwin, Raymond, Minnie B, Dorothy, and Robert) successfully graduated from college
 Family business: Three of his sons would go to work in J.A. Jones Construction
 Edwin was hired in 1913 and handled administrative duties within the company
 Raymond was the assistant superintendent of J.A. Jones 
 Johnnie was in charge of accounting and office management
 Deaths: 
 Bobbie, died in infancy. 
 Frances Elizabeth, died of tuberculosis in December 1925
 Johnnie, drowned in May 1935
 Raymond, died of stroke in May 1950

Later years and death 
Jones remained an active man until the last few months of his life.  He had medical troubles with colds and influenza in the winter of 1949-1950 which left him in a slightly weakened state.  He also suffered from a mild stroke that winter.  He continued to go into the office up until the last three days of his life.  He died of a cerebral hemorrhage at 7:46 pm on 20 May 1950 at the age of 80.

Professional life 
Jones, a self-taught man, rose those his mason apprenticeship quickly and became a general contractor after his first jobs as a mason. The first building Jones would building was the "dining-car job" which was an addition to the Southern Railway Station.  There were many roadblocks to their success as a flood ruined their original wall and Jones only had four workers.  He personally helped his workers rebuild the wall, creating a motto that would last his entire career "Finish the Job."

In his early career, he served as the Superintendent of Maintenance-a-way for the Southern Railway, working on repairs from washouts or wrecks and then helping restore the traffic after wrecks.  He returned home to Charlotte and started gathering contracts to help build Charlotte's first skyscrapers such as the twelve-store Independence Building, completed in 1909.  The company continued its work and had a few contracts during the First World War, finishing all the jobs they were given despite financial troubles and eventually the company became incorporated in 1920.  During the Depression, J.A. Jones Construction weathered the storm with government contracts to build a new military air base in the Panama Canal Zone, Albrook Field.  Jones went on to gain more government contracts building housing, post offices, military bases, and other projects.  One of his more well known projects was the creation of the shipyards in Panama City, Florida and Brunswick, Georgia where the chief product was the Liberty Ships.

The company continued to grow after World War II, maintaining military contracts as well as expanding into other international markets.  After a restructuring in 1948, Jones became the chairman of the board while his sons took over as president and executive vice president, the company went into heavy construction and highway work.  The company was bought in 1978 by Philipp Holzmann AG, a west German construction company but would remain J.A. Jones construction with family ties until May 1993 when a veteran Charles Davidson would take over as president and CEO.

Interests and philanthropy

Methodist Church 
Jones first attended church in Charlotte, and met his future wife, Minnie, at Tyron Street Methodist Church.  The J.A. Jones Construction company helped build Dilworth Methodist Church across the street from the Jones' home in Charlotte.  In 1927, the company and family help to add a two-story parsonage, then in 1940, they assisted with the building of the J.A. Jones Education Building.  Finally, the family helped build the Memorial Chapel, furnishing it as well as a donation of stained glass windows.

Jones served as delegate to five Methodist General Conferences as representative for the Western North Carolina Conference, also the Uniting Conference, and three Jurisdictional Conferences relating to the Methodist Church. He also served on the board of trustees for the Methodist Home for the Aged.

Civic responsibilities 
Jones was an active member of his community, serving numerous positions of importance within the city of Charlotte as well as the surrounding areas.  He helped save Charlotte from drought as he developed a system to supply the growing city with the amount of water needed, using pipes connecting to the Catawba River rather than relying on artesian wells. He was also on the Board of Commissions for two to three terms around 1930 as well as the executive committee to help oversee department's efficiency in the city of Charlotte.  He was an active member of the Y.M.C.A., was on the board of trustees for at least three regional hospitals (Charlotte Memorial, the North Carolina Orthopedic Hospital at Gastonia, and the Elkin Hospital), a member of the Phalanx Lodge of Masonry, a Shriner, and was president of numerous hotel and realty companies (Addison Realty, Skyline Hotel Company, Highlands Hotel Company).  Jones also served as the director of the Bank of Commerce and of the Interstate Milling Company and of the Citizens Hotel Company).  He also was on the board of trustees at Greensboro College.

Awards and donations 
In 1944, he received the Maritime "M", the highest award given by the Maritime Commission for his assistance in World War II with the construction of the Liberty ships, a type of cargo ship.  He also received the Army-Navy "E" award, an honor for excellence in production of war equipment.

There are two libraries named after Jones, one at Greensboro College in Greensboro, North Carolina, and another at Brevard College in Brevard, North Carolina.  The J.A. Jones library at Brevard College was originally built in 1948 with the help of J.A. Jones Construction and was dedicated on 10 April 1948.  The cost of the library was approximately $100,000 with a capacity of up to 40,000 volumes. Although, the library has been moved to another building in the 1960s, it kept the J.A. Jones name as well as the portrait originally unveiled at the original library's opening.

Notable works 
A number of his works are listed on the U.S. National Register of Historic Places.

Works include (with variations in attribution):
Addison Apartments, 831 E. Morehead St., Charlotte, North Carolina (Jones,J.A.), NRHP-listed
Dillon County Courthouse, built 1911, at 1303 W. Main St., Dillon, South Carolina (Jones,J.A.), NRHP-listed
Fire Station No. 2, 1212 South Blvd., Charlotte, North Carolina (Jones,J.A.), NRHP-listed
Frederick Apartments, 515 N. Church St., Charlotte, North Carolina (Jones, J.A., Construction Company), NRHP-listed
Hoke County Courthouse, Main and Edenborough Sts., Raeford, North Carolina (Jones,J.A.), NRHP-listed
Hoskins Mill, 201 S. Hoskins Rd., Charlotte, North Carolina (Jones,J.A., Construction Co.), NRHP-listed
Hotel Charlotte (demolished 1988), 327 W. Trade St., Charlotte, North Carolina (Jones,J.A.), NRHP-listed

References

External links

American construction businesspeople
American philanthropists
1950 deaths
1869 births